Michael or Mike McGuire may refer to:

Michael McGuire (politician) (1926–2018), British Labour Party politician
Michael J. McGuire (born 1947), environmental engineer and writer
Michael T. McGuire (1929–2016), American psychiatrist
Michael McGuire (author), author and newspaper columnist
Mike McGuire (baseball), American college baseball coach
Mike McGuire (basketball) (born 1977), American college basketball coach
Mike McGuire (politician) (born 1979), California politician
Michael McGuire (actor) (born 1934), American actor

See also
Michael Maguire (disambiguation)
Mickey McGuire (disambiguation)
McGuire (surname)